Darren Michael Webster (born 10 June 1968) is an English darts player nicknamed Demolition Man.

Career
Webster won the 2005 Open Oust Nederland, beating Co Stompé in the final.

Originally nicknamed The Sniper, Webster reached the quarter-finals of the 2007 PDC World Darts Championship, where he beat former champion Bob Anderson, Adrian Gray and South African Wynand Havenga, before being beaten 5–1 by Phil Taylor.

Webster reached the last 16 at the 2007 UK Open. He beat Andy Hamilton and James Wade, before losing to Alan Green.

In December 2013, Webster lost to James Wade in the first round of the 2014 World Championship, despite leading 2 sets to 1 (first to 3). He missed six darts to win the match, to which Wade responded in three straight legs, thus winning the match. He played in the World Matchplay for the first time since 2005 and was beaten 10–4 by Taylor in the first round. Webster's resurgence of form also saw him play in his first World Grand Prix and Grand Slam of Darts, but he lost in the opening round of the former and was defeated in all three of his group games in the latter. A final appearance in a major event of the year came at the Players Championship Finals where he missed two match darts in the deciding leg of the first round against Robert Thornton to lose 6–5.

Webster atoned for his misses against Wade a year earlier when he faced Simon Whitlock in the 2015 edition of the World Championship. From 1–1 in sets he only allowed the world number seven one more leg as he beat him 3–1. He won a trio of sets in deciding legs to lead Dean Winstanley 3–2 in the second round. However, Webster lost two sets in a row to be beaten 4–3. Webster twice reached the quarter-final stage of Players Championship events in 2015.

Webster saw off John Henderson 3–1 in the opening round of the 2016 World Championship, but Michael van Gerwen averaged 109.23 in their second round clash as Webster could only win one leg in a 4–0 defeat. A 9–8 win over Ricky Evans saw him reach the fifth round of the UK Open for the second time in his career and he lost 9–5 to Peter Wright. Webster's first semi-final in over two and a half years came at the ninth Players Championship and he was beaten 6–1 by Benito van de Pas. Another came at the 17th event, but he was whitewashed 6–0 by Van Gerwen. Webster was already eliminated from the Grand Slam of Darts before his third group game with Phil Taylor after losing his opening two matches, but nevertheless thrashed the 16-time world champion 5–0. Webster stated that the result would give him a confidence boost for the remainder of the year. He was right, because at the Players Championship Finals he saw off Jonny Clayton and Simon Whitlock both 6–3, Alan Norris 10–5 and Christian Kist 10–6 to reach the semi-finals of a PDC major for the first time. Webster stormed in to a 6–0 lead over Van Gerwen, but missed a dart to be 7–2 ahead as Van Gerwen closed to 6–6. Webster did take a one leg lead on two further occasions, but would ultimately be defeated 11–8.

Webster survived seven match darts from Stephen Bunting in the first round of the 2017 World Championship to progress with a 3–2 win. Webster had finishes of 157, 147 and 140 during the match. He described his second round 4–0 victory over Simon Whitlock as the moment of his career as Webster averaged 104.64 and closed the match with a 140 finish. He missed two darts to take the opening set in the third round against Van Gerwen and went 3–0 behind. He pulled a set back, but would be ousted 4–1.

Webster hit his first career nine-dart finish on 11 February 2017 in the 5th UK Open qualifier during a 6-5 win over Benito van de Pas. In July, he won his first players Championship title, defeating Daryl Gurney 6–1 in the final in Barnsley.

In the 2019 World Championship he suffered a surprise defeat and whitewash to Vincent van der Voort losing 3-0 in the Second Round.

Webster lost his tour card following the 2022 PDC World Darts Championship but regained it on the second day of the 2022 Q-School Final stage.

World Championship results

PDC

2006: First round (lost to Erwin Extercatte 2–3)
2007: Quarter-finals (lost to Phil Taylor 1–5)
2013: First round (lost to Mark Walsh 1–3)
2014: First round (lost to James Wade 2–3)
2015: Second round (lost to Dean Winstanley 3–4)
2016: Second round (lost to Michael van Gerwen 0–4)
2017: Third round (lost to Michael van Gerwen 1–4)
2018: Quarter-finals (lost to Jamie Lewis 0–5)
2019: Second round (lost to Vincent van der Voort 0–3)
2020: Third round (lost to Adrian Lewis 3–4)

Performance timeline

PDC European Tour

References

External links
Darren Webster's Official Website

1968 births
Living people
Sportspeople from Norwich
English darts players
Professional Darts Corporation current tour card holders
PDC ranking title winners